Penarol Atlético Clube, commonly known as Penarol, is a Brazilian football club based in Itacoatiara, Amazonas.

Penarol is currently ranked third among Amazonas teams in CBF's national club ranking at 130th place overall. They are the best placed team in the state from outside of Greater Manaus.

History
The club was founded on August 8, 1947 by Luiz Calheiros Gama, Marcos Esteves, Sebastião Mestrinho, Simões Sales de Souza, Laureano Seixas and Antônio Gesta Filho. Penarol won the Campeonato Amazonense in 2010 and in 2011. The club will compete in the 2011 Série D.

Current squad

Achievements

 Campeonato Amazonense:
 Winners (3): 2010, 2011, 2020

References

External links
 Official website

Football clubs in Amazonas (Brazilian state)
Association football clubs established in 1947
Itacoatiara, Amazonas
1947 establishments in Brazil